Willie & Phil is a 1980 American comedy-drama film written and directed by Paul Mazursky and starring Michael Ontkean, Margot Kidder, and Ray Sharkey.

Plot
The film is set in late 1970s New York City, amidst the counterculture chic of that era. Willie, a high school English teacher who plays jazz piano, and Phil, a fashion photographer, meet coming out of the Bleecker Street Cinema, where Jules et Jim has just been shown, and become friends. They both fall in love with Jeannette, a girl from Kentucky.

Cast
 Michael Ontkean - Willie Kaufman
 Margot Kidder - Jeannette Sutherland
 Ray Sharkey - Phil D'Amico
 Jan Miner - Maria Kaufman
 Tom Brennan - Sal Kaufman
 Julie Bovasso - Mrs. D'Amico
 Louis Guss - Mr. D'Amico
 Kathleen Maguire - Mrs. Sutherland
 Kaki Hunter - Patti Sutherland
 Kristine DeBell - Rena
 Jerry Hall - Karen

Critical responses
The film was reviewed by Pauline Kael in The New Yorker. "It could be that the theme of Jules et Jim, which preoccupies Mazursky - woman as the source of life and art, and woman as destroyer - is just what he can't handle. The ad for Willie & Phil does bring out the film's latent subject: we see the open mouth of a giant goddess who is holding two men in the palm of her hand. They reach up to her with their offerings - one with a bottle of wine, the other with a bunch of flowers. She may be breathing life into these dwarf suitors or preparing to devour them along with their gifts. Either way, she's a source of awe and terror. All through the picture, Mazursky has been trying to demystify what he experiences as mystifying. This movie is a little monument to screwed-up notions of what women are."

References

External links
 
 

1980 comedy-drama films
1980 films
1980s romantic comedy-drama films
20th Century Fox films
American romantic comedy-drama films
Fictional duos
Films directed by Paul Mazursky
Films set in New York City
Films set in the 1970s
Films shot in New York City
Films scored by Claude Bolling
1980s English-language films
1980s American films